Głuszkowo  (German Holzkathen) is a settlement in the administrative district of Gmina Świdwin, within Świdwin County, West Pomeranian Voivodeship, in north-western Poland.

The settlement has a population of 40.

References

Villages in Świdwin County